Grierson is a 1973 documentary directed by Roger Blais for the National Film Board of Canada (NFB). It won, among other awards, the 1974 BAFTA Award for Best Documentary. 

John Grierson, who is known as the father of documentary film and coined the term 'documentary', became the first Canadian Government Film Commissioner, and founded the NFB, in 1939. He believed that filmmakers have a social responsibility, and that film should help society realize democratic ideals. His faith in the value of capturing everyday life influenced generations of filmmakers all over the world.

Grierson, which cost $242,725 to make, includes archival footage and interviews with Grierson and people who knew him. It was released in English and French, with commentary by Donald Brittain; the English version was narrated by Michael Kane, the French version by Monique Miller.

Awards
 27th British Academy Film Awards, London: BAFTA Award for Best Documentary, 1974
 25th Canadian Film Awards, Montreal: Best Documentary (tied), 1973
 Festival of World Television, Los Angeles: Best Profile Documentary, 1973
 Golden Gate International Film Festival, San Francisco: First Prize, Personality, 1973
 Golden Gate International Film Festival, San Francisco: Bronze Reel Award for Third Best Film, 1973
 Melbourne Film Festival, Melbourne: Diploma of Merit, 1974

References

Works cited

External links
 Grierson at the National Film Board of Canada
 

1973 films
Canadian short documentary films
National Film Board of Canada documentaries
Best Short Documentary Film Genie and Canadian Screen Award winners
1973 documentary films
Cultural depictions of Indira Gandhi
1970s French-language films
French-language Canadian films
1970s Canadian films
1970s short documentary films